The 1986 California Golden Bears football team was an American football team that represented the University of California, Berkeley in the Pacific-10 Conference (Pac-10) during the 1986 NCAA Division I-A football season. In their fifth year under head coach Joe Kapp, the Golden Bears compiled a 2–9 record (2–7 against Pac-10 opponents), finished in ninth place in the Pac-10, and were outscored by their opponents by a combined total of 325 to 145.

The team's statistical leaders included Troy Taylor with 891 passing yards, Marc Hicks with 357 rushing yards, and James Devers with 582 receiving yards.

Schedule

Personnel

Season summary

Stanford

References

California
California Golden Bears football seasons
California Golden Bears football